The Higley Unified School District #60, abbreviated HUSD #60 is a school district in Gilbert, Arizona. The school district serves portions of Gilbert and Queen Creek. It is one of Arizona's fastest growing school districts, with modest continued growth despite the downturn in the economy at the end of the 2000s (decade). The District owns two preschools, nine elementary schools, two middle schools, two high schools, and one virtual academy. In August 2013, the district opened two new middle schools and all other elementary schools that hosted grades K-8 went down to K-6.

History
The Higley district was incorporated in 1909 with a territory far larger than its current size, but most of the land was transferred to other Valley school districts over the years. For instance, the Queen Creek Unified School District was carved out of the Higley district in 1947. Higley Elementary School was the only school in the district for the next 53 years. The district's high school students went to Gilbert Public Schools' high schools. As the Valley expanded, Larry Likes, then-superintendent of the district, brought it through an era of suburbia swallowing the local farmland. It was not long before the growth of the 1990s and 2000s caught up to the district's  service area. In 1999, the district legally unified; in 2000, it opened Coronado Elementary School, its first new school in decades; in 2001, Higley High School opened its doors; four years later, it opened up Gateway Pointe Elementary School, then a year later, it opened Cortina Elementary School; another year later, further growth induced the opening of Williams Field High School. In the spring of 2008, Higley became the first district in Arizona to receive K-12 accreditation by the AdvancED/North Central Accreditation Team. Graduating Higley seniors were offered $2.7 million in academic and athletic scholarships.

In early 2011, for the first time, Higley grew to larger than 10,000 students as a school district.

The district opened two middle schools (Cooley Middle School and Sossaman Middle School) to better prepare 7th and 8th grade students for high school and to alleviate projected capacity issues at its elementary schools.

About HUSD
Higley Unified School District is a rapidly growing district in the state of Arizona. It owns 2 preschools, 9 elementary schools, 2 middle schools and 2 high schools.

Higley allows open-enrollment to all parent for the school of their choice, regardless of the individual school boundaries. The district also allows children who are homeless to register for school.

The District has two administrative sites. The primary administration building is located north of Higley High School and the transportation center of the district is located south of Williams Field High School.

Each high school has a resource officer to help protect the school environment from disruptions and crimes.

Curriculum
All preschool classes are split into 2 classes per day, depending on the school and the time the classes start. Higley offers full day kindergarten classes at its schools. Higley's comprehensive curriculum is aligned with the Arizona Academic Standards and the new Common Core Standards. The District primarily focuses on the core standards, which are Reading, Writing, Math, Science, and Social Studies. Higley also offers free full day kindergarten classes, technological instructions, library media services, K-8 Art, Music, and Physical Education, Character Education, and Before and After School Enrichment Programs. In Middle School, Higley offers choir, band, strings, applied technology, Spanish, and many skills for success. Along with its academic programs, Higley provides students athletic programs to encourage children to be actively fit while focusing on academics. The Middle Schools also offer early development childhood (preschool) services. Higley Unified School often tries new academic programs and standards not yet passed or effective in the state to allow students to get used to the new curriculum and align it in the future.

District Website
The Higley Unified School District website is filled with many district news. Each school has their own webpages, and each school can add any programs, activities, or information they want. Each school has a dedicated teacher page so that teachers may upload assignments to their students and students can access the assignments at home. This is beneficial for students. For example, students can check their teacher's page to see missing assignments that he/she can print out and make-up.

Statistics and Demographics (2010-2011)
 Student Enrollment: 10,352
 Higley High School Graduation Rate: 90%
 Williams Field High School Graduation Rate: 91%
 Combined High School Graduation Rate: 91%
 Attendance Rate: 95%

School Events and Bell Times
The school has 180 instructional days; the year begins in July and ends in May. There are 3 2 week breaks: a Fall Break in September and October, a winter break in December and January, and a Spring Break in March. Every last Wednesday of the month, all district schools have early release days so that teachers can hold conferences.

The district approved in January 2013 a new bell times to match with the new middle schools:

New Middle Schools
Beginning 2012, Higley Unified School District is in an lease agreement to construct and build two new middle schools to alleviate the growing population of the district. The two new middle schools are Cooley Middle School and Sossaman Middle School. The District Board approved in December 2012 its Feeder-System, showing which elementary schools will feed into each middle school and into the high schools. During the summer of 2013, the District Governing Board voted to submit a form to register the two middle schools as charter schools, which was approved at the beginning of the 2013–2014 school year in August 2013. They are:

The District created a website to discuss updates and information for the new middle schools. Higley Middle Schools

Higley Center for the Performing Arts
The District built the HCPA and opened in spring of 2006. The HCPA has a large concert hall, seating 1,235 people and a little theatre, able to sit 186 people. Over 500 productions are yearly shown in the building. It is located adjacent to the Higley High School, and schools throughout the district use it to show major assemblies or guest speakers.

Transportation
Transportation of students from the various schools throughout the district is provided by the District's transportation crew. They currently have 63 School Buses and 53 Support Vehicles. The district mandates that all students taking a field trip must be approved by parents. The district also provides transportation for students to and from school. Any student who lives within one mile from the school they go to, although, does not have transportation, and will have to transport themselves to and from school. To better balance all the school bus use to transport students to and from school, the district changed the school bell times to help align the high schools, middle schools, and elementary schools so as to not cause traffic.

Schools

Elementary schools (grades K-6)

Middle schools (grades 7-8)

High schools (grades 9-12)

Awards
In 2011, the Higley Unified School District was rated an "A" by the Arizona Department of Education.  It was one of 14 districts to receive that rating, joined in the rankings by two neighboring districts, the Chandler Unified School District and the Queen Creek Unified School District.  It again received an "A" rating in 2012 and in 2013, joined in the rankings by the same neighboring districts as 2011, as well as the neighboring Gilbert Public Schools.

See also

 Chandler Unified School District
 Queen Creek Unified School District
 Gilbert Public Schools

References

External links
Higley Unified School District Official site.

School districts in Maricopa County, Arizona
1909 establishments in Arizona Territory
School districts established in 1909